Secreto para tres, (English: Secret three) is a Mexican telenovela produced by Televisa and originally transmitted in 1969 by Telesistema Mexicano.

Cast 
Rita Macedo
Antonio Medellín - Le Four 
Carlos Ancira
Tere Vale
Mauricio Herrera
Eduardo MacGregor
Jorge Mondragón
Mario Cid
Yolanda Ciani
Jose Peña Pepet
Enrique Pontón
Gustavo Bernal

References

External links 

Mexican telenovelas
Televisa telenovelas
Spanish-language telenovelas
1969 telenovelas
1969 Mexican television series debuts
1969 Mexican television series endings